Leptogaster cylindrica  is a Palearctic species of robber fly in the family Asilidae.

References

External links
Geller Grim Robberflies of Germany
Images representing Leptogaster cylindrica

Brachyceran flies of Europe
Asilidae
Insects described in 1776
Taxa named by Charles De Geer